

A Nazi punk is a neo-Nazi who is part of the punk subculture. The term also describes the related music genre, which is sometimes also referred to as hatecore. Nazi Punk music generally sounds like other forms of punk rock, but differs by having lyrics that express hatred of some ethnic minorities, Jews, communists, homosexuals, anarchists, and other perceived enemies.

It is a subgenre of punk that contrasts sharply with the anti-authoritarian and frequently leftist ideas prevalent in much of the punk subculture.

In 1978 in Britain, the white nationalist National Front had a punk-oriented youth organization called the Punk Front. Although the Punk Front only lasted one year, it recruited several English punks, as well as forming a number of white power punk bands such as Dentists, The Ventz, Tragic Minds, and White Boss. In the early 1980s, the white power skinhead band Brutal Attack temporarily transformed into a Nazi punk band.

The Nazi Punk subculture appeared in the United States by the early 1980s in the hardcore punk scene.

See also 
 List of neo-Nazi bands
 National Socialist black metal
 Nazi chic
 Nipster
 Punk ideologies
 Rock Against Communism
 White nationalism
 Nazi Punks Fuck Off

Footnotes

Bibliography
 Blush, Steven, American Hardcore: A Tribal History
 Condemned Magazine issue #2.
 Morrison, Eddy, Memoirs of a Street Soldier: A Life in White Nationalism 
 National Front, The Punk Front: 1978–79
 Reynolds, Simon, Rip It Up and Start Again: Postpunk 1978–1984 
 Sabin, Roger, Punk Rock: So What?

External links
 National Socialist Punk – Nazi punk history, ideology and music

Ethnocentrism
Hardcore punk
Musical subcultures
Neo-fascism
Neo-Nazi concepts
Neo-Nazi music
Politics and race
Youth culture
British rock music genres
Alt-right